Langley is a village and civil parish in the Maidstone District of Kent, England. The parish is located on the A274 road leading south from Maidstone to Headcorn .

History

Langley is a common English place-name, from the Old English lang leah or ‘long field or woodland’. This village first appears in the records in 814 as Longanleag.

The village church is dedicated to St Mary. Behind this church is a lake, which is possible place for the medieval judicial practice of trial by cold water. When a jury couldn't decide on a person's innocence, it was left to God to decide. If the accused floated they were guilty because the water rejected them. If they sank, the water accepted them and thus were innocent. As is often thought it is not if they drowned, but the result was drowning in some cases. It had to be close to the church because the water would be holy.

Maidstone Museum & Art Gallery exhibits articles excavated from a site in Langley believed to have been a walled Roman cemetery.

Geography
The village is three miles (5km) from the county town.

Culture and Community
The village has two public houses, The Potting Shed, and The Plough.

Its post office has been closed for over 10 years.

There is also 'Langley Heath', which by it, is a woods, called Abby Wood.

There is a village hall, on it is a playing field with room for 2 football pitches, and a small play area, and a basketball net.

References

External links

http://www.langley-kent.org.uk
Langley church

Villages in Kent
Civil parishes in Kent